Spade and Grave (S&G) is a senior society at Yale University in New Haven, Connecticut. Founded in 1864, S&G is one of Yale's oldest societies. The society meets in its tomb near Yale's campus.

History

Formed in 1864, Spade and Grave grew out of hostility toward Skull and Bones and plotted to overthrow it. An argument with three Bonesman editors of the Yale Literary Magazine inspired two "neutral" editors to launch the aspiring rival society. Its insignia was based on the Hamlet scene in which the gravedigger tosses up Yorick's skull with his spade.

Like other secret societies at Yale, S&G meets as a group on Thursdays and Sundays. One of the central aspects of meetings is the "bio," in which each member spends one evening recounting his or her life history, personal development, and aspirations to the group.

Notable members

 Frederick Elizur Goodrich (1864), author of The Life and Public Services of Winfield Scott Hancock.
 Edwin Meese (1952), 75th Attorney General of the United States.
 John Curtis Perry (1952), the Henry Willard Denison Professor Emeritus of History at the Fletcher School of Law and Diplomacy, Tufts University.
 Dick Celeste (1959), 64th Governor of Ohio.
 Jonathan Fanton (1965), President Emeritus of the American Academy of Arts and Sciences and The New School.
 John Rothchild (1967), former freelance writer and Time and Fortune columnist.

Other Yale University senior societies

 Aurelian Honor Society
 Berzelius
 Book and Snake
 Brothers in Unity
 Elihu
 Leviathan
 Linonian Society
 Mace and Chain
 Manuscript Society
 Myth and Sword
 Sage and Chalice
 Scroll and Key
 Shabtai
 Skull and Bones
 St. Elmo
 Torch Honor Society
 Wolf's Head

See also
List of Yale University student organizations
Collegiate secret societies in North America

References 

Collegiate secret societies
Secret societies in the United States
Yale College
Culture of Yale University
1864 establishments in the United States
Secret societies at Yale
Student organizations established in 1864